Pyrenees is a steel inverted roller coaster at Parque Espana-Shima Spain Village in Shima, Mie, Japan. It opened in 1997 and was manufactured by Swiss company Bolliger & Mabillard.

Ride experience
The train departs the station and immediately begins to ascend the  lift hill. Once the train has crested the top of the lift hill, it banks to the right and drops at  into a vertical loop. Exiting the vertical loop, the train then enters a zero-g roll, and then another vertical loop. Coming out of the second vertical loop, the train makes a high speed banked turn to the left and travels up into a cobra roll. Leaving the cobra roll, the train travels into a right hand helix which goes through the center of the second vertical loop. Pulling out of the helix, the train enters the mid-course brake run. Following the mid-course brake run, the train drops and enters a corkscrew which leads into a wide banked turn to the left. The train then travels over a small hill before making a right turn that leads into the final brake run.

References

Roller coasters in Japan
Roller coasters introduced in 1997